Ukraine's 7th electoral district is a Verkhovna Rada constituency in the Autonomous Republic of Crimea. Established in its current form in 2012, it includes the cities of Yalta and Alushta, as well as their surrounding metropolitan areas (Yalta Municipality and Alushta Municipality, respectively). The constituency is home to 149,101 registered voters, and has 105 polling stations. Since the Annexation of Crimea by the Russian Federation in 2014, the seat has been vacant.

Members of Parliament

Elections

2012

See also
Electoral districts of Ukraine
Foreign electoral district of Ukraine

References

Electoral districts of Ukraine
Constituencies established in 2012